Rex Wang (Haokun) one of the 10 Chinese team in World Rubik’s Cube Championships in Las Vegas 2013. Rex is also Pyraminx Chinese record holder, Rubik’s Mater Magic Asian record holder (second in the world) and the second place holder in the Physics of the project in McMaster Engineering & Science Olympics Competitions 2012.

References

External links
Haokun Wang（Rex ）12.91s Rubik's Cube

Canadian chief executives
Living people
McMaster University alumni
Year of birth missing (living people)